Old Caves Crater is a cinder cone located in Coconino National Forest, near Flagstaff, Arizona. Its name comes from the numerous small caves on the slopes of the cinder cone. A forest of new growth ponderosa pines cover the lower slopes of the cone, while a pinyon-juniper forest covers the upper slopes. A trail leads to the top of Old Caves Crater, providing views of the San Francisco Peaks and the surrounding area. In the 14th century, Native Americans built a settlement adjacent to the crater.

References 

Cinder cones of the United States
Hills of Arizona
Landforms of Coconino County, Arizona
Volcanoes of Arizona